Malaika (born Malaika LeRae Sallard, January 2, 1972, in Seattle, Washington) also known under name Malaika Sallard Johnson, is a female African American dance singer from Seattle, Washington. During her short lived music career she recorded only one album  entitled Sugar Time, which managed two Top 5 hits on the US Billboard Hot Dance Music/Club Play chart, including her number #1 single, "Gotta Know (Your Name)" in 1993.

Sallard is tied with another A&M recording artist, CeCe Peniston, who took her own chances by performing backup vocals on the Overweight Pooch's album record Female Preacher in 1991, originally intended for Malaika.

Discography

Albums

Singles

Other contributions

See also
List of number-one dance hits (United States)
List of artists who reached number one on the US Dance chart

References

External links

Malaika on Discogs

1972 births
Living people
Musicians from Seattle
American dance musicians
American house musicians
A&M Records artists
Singers from Washington (state)
20th-century African-American women singers